An Australian region tropical cyclone is a non-frontal, low-pressure system that has developed within an environment of warm sea surface temperatures and little vertical wind shear aloft in either the Southern Indian Ocean or the South Pacific Ocean. Within the Southern Hemisphere there are officially three areas where tropical cyclones develop on a regular basis:  the South-West Indian Ocean between Africa and 90°E, the Australian region between 90°E and 160°E, and the South Pacific basin between 160°E and 120°W. The Australian region between 90°E and 160°E is officially monitored by the Australian Bureau of Meteorology, the Indonesian Meteorology, Climatology, and Geophysical Agency, and the Papua New Guinea National Weather Service, while others like the Fiji Meteorological Service and the United States National Oceanic and Atmospheric Administration also monitor the basin. Each tropical cyclone year within this basin starts on 1 July and runs throughout the year, encompassing the tropical cyclone season, which runs from 1 November and lasts until 30 April each season. Within the basin, most tropical cyclones have their origins within the South Pacific convergence zone or within the Northern Australian monsoon trough, both of which form an extensive area of cloudiness and are dominant features of the season. Within this region a tropical disturbance is classified as a tropical cyclone when it has 10-minute sustained wind speeds of more than 65 km/h (35 mph) that wrap halfway around the low level circulation centre, while a severe tropical cyclone is classified when the maximum 10-minute sustained wind speeds are greater than 120 km/h (75 mph).

Basin history
There is a history of tropical cyclones affecting northeastern Australia for over 5000 years; however, Clement Lindley Wragge was the first person to monitor and name them.

In the early history of tropical cyclones in the Australian region, the only evidence of a storm was based on ship reports and observations from land. Later, satellite imagery began in the basin in the 1959-60 season, although it was not continuous until 1970. In Western Australia in particular, the lack of population centers, shipping lanes, radars, and offshore stations meant that storms were tracked infrequently. After the onset of satellite imagery, the Dvorak technique was used to estimate storms' intensities and locations.

Each of three tropical cyclone warning centres (TCWCs) of the Bureau of Meteorology in Perth, Darwin and Brisbane used its own tropical cyclone naming list until the 2008–09 season, when the three TCWCs started to use the single Australian national naming list. From the 2020–21 season, the three TCWCs were unified into one single TCWC which still monitors all tropical cyclones that form within the Australian region, including any within the areas of responsibility of TCWC Jakarta or TCWC Port Moresby. Later in 2021, the Australian tropical cyclone warning centre was officially named as TCWC Melbourne.

Background
The Australian region is currently defined as being between 90°E and 160°E, and is monitored by five different warning centres during the season, which runs from 1 November to 30 April.

Australian tropical cyclone outlook regions
The Bureau of Meteorology defines four regions within the Australian region which are used when the bureau issues tropical cyclone seasonal outlooks every year. These four regions are named the Western region, the Northwestern sub-region, the Northern region and the Eastern region. The Australian region overall averages eleven tropical cyclones in a season, and the bureau assesses the region as a whole to have a high level of accuracy when forecasting tropical cyclone activity.

The Western region encompasses the area east of 90°E and west of 125°E. The region covers the eastern Indian Ocean including the Cocos (Keeling) Islands and Christmas Island, and waters off Western Australia west of Kuri Bay. The region also covers waters off Indonesia that include the main islands of Java, Bali, Lombok, Sumbawa, Sumba, Flores and the western half of Timor. The region averages seven tropical cyclones in a season, and the bureau assesses the region to have a low level of accuracy when forecasting tropical cyclone activity.

The Northwestern sub-region encompasses the area east of 105°E, west of 130°E and north of 25°S. The sub-region covers waters off Western Australia north of Shark Bay, and extends westward to Christmas Island. The sub-region also covers waters off Indonesia as far west as Java and as far east as Timor. The sub-region averages five tropical cyclones in a season, and the bureau assesses the sub-region to have a moderate level of accuracy when forecasting tropical cyclone activity.

The Northern region encompasses the area east of 125°E and west of 142.5°E. The region covers the Timor Sea, the Banda Sea, the Arafura Sea and the Gulf of Carpentaria. The region averages three tropical cyclones in a season, and the bureau assesses the region to have a very low level of accuracy when forecasting tropical cyclone activity.

The Eastern region encompasses the area east of 142.5°E and west of 160°E. The region covers waters east of Torres Strait and includes the Coral Sea and the Tasman Sea. Lord Howe Island lies within the region, but Norfolk Island lies east of the region, although the bureau continues to monitor tropical cyclones when they are a threat to the external territory. The region also covers waters off Papua New Guinea and western parts of the Solomon Islands. The region averages four tropical cyclones in a season, and the bureau assesses the region to have a low level of accuracy when forecasting tropical cyclone activity.

Seasons

Before 1900

1900–1909

1910–1919

1920–1929

1930–1939

1940–1949

1950–1959

1960–1969

1970s

1980s

1990s

2000s

2010s

2020s

See also

Tropical cyclone
Atlantic hurricane
Pacific hurricane
Typhoon
North Indian Ocean tropical cyclone
South-West Indian Ocean tropical cyclone
South Pacific tropical cyclone
South Atlantic tropical cyclone
Mediterranean tropical-like cyclone

Notes

References

External links
 Australian Bureau of Meteorology 
 Joint Typhoon Warning Center 
 Tropical Cyclone Warning Center Jakarta 
 Digital Typhoon

 
Australian region cyclone seasons
Australian region cyclone seasons